Shelter is the second album by American country rock band Lone Justice, released in November 1986.

Critical reception 
Jon Pareles, music critic for The New York Times, gave high praise to McKee's singing and the band's musicianship, but described the album as something of a disappointment in that "the band's songwriting has grown weaker": whereas the songs of the debut album were filled with "down-to-earth details that make country music hit home", those of Shelter "are much vaguer – they're about abstracted emotions rather than recognizable people".

Track listing
Writing credits adapted from the album's liner notes.

Charts

Personnel
Adapted from the album's liner notes.

Lone Justice
Maria McKee – vocals, guitar, piano
Ryan Hedgecock – guitar
Shane Fontayne – guitar
Greg Sutton – bass guitar, vocals
Bruce Brody – keyboards
Rudy Richman – drums

Additional personnel
Tommy Mandel – keyboards
Benmont Tench – keyboards
Charles Judge – keyboards
Little Steven – acoustic guitar, rhythm guitar
Vesta Williams – background vocals [1]
Portia Griffin – background vocals [1]
Alexandra Brown – background vocals [1]
Audrey Wheeler – background vocals [4]
Brenda White-King – background vocals [4]
Kevin Dorsey – background vocals [5]
Debra Dobkin – percussion [7]

Production
Little Steven – producer
Jimmy Iovine – producer
Lone Justice – producer
Joe Chiccarelli – associate producer, engineer, mixing
Robert de la Garza – engineer
Don Smith – engineer
Steven Rinkoff – engineer
Niko Bolas – engineer
Bruce Lampcov – engineer
Joe Borja – engineer
Scott Litt – engineer
Greg Edward – engineer, mixing
Shelly Yakus – engineer, mixing
Rob Jacobs – assistant engineer
Michael Bowman – assistant engineer
Marc DeSisto – assistant engineer
Craig Engel – assistant engineer
Ross Stein – assistant engineer
Mike Shipley – mixing
Humberto Gatica  – mixing
Stephen Marcussen – mastering
Janet Weber – production coordination 
Paula Pavlik – production assistant
Cooper Edens – cover art
Melanie Nissen – photography
Kim Champagne – design

References

Lone Justice albums
1986 albums
Albums produced by Jimmy Iovine
Albums produced by Steven Van Zandt
Geffen Records albums
Albums recorded at Henson Recording Studios